Afrihili (Ni Afrihili Oluga 'the Afrihili language') is a constructed language designed in 1970 by Ghanaian historian K. A. Kumi Attobrah (Kumi Atɔbra) to be used as a lingua franca in all of Africa. The name of the language is a combination of Africa and Swahili.  The author, a native of Akrokerri (Akrokɛri) in Ghana, originally conceived of the idea in 1967 while on a sea voyage from Dover to Calais.  His intention was that "it would promote unity and understanding among the different peoples of the continent, reduce costs in printing due to translations and promote trade".  It is meant to be easy for Africans to learn.

Source languages
Afrihili draws its phonology, morphology and syntax from various African languages, particularly Swahili and Akan (Attobrah's native language). The lexicon covers various African languages, as well as words from many other sources "so Africanized that they do not appear foreign", although no specific etymologies are indicated by the author. However, the semantics is quite English, with many calques of English expressions, perhaps due to the strong English influence on written Swahili and Akan. For example, mu is 'in', to is 'to', and muto is 'into'; similarly, kupitia is 'through' (as in 'through this remedy'), paasa is 'out' (as in to go outside), and kupitia-paasa is 'throughout'—at least in the original, 1970 version of the language.

Script and pronunciation
Foreign names are spelled out phonetically rather than in the original orthography, so for example 'Hastings' is spelled Hestins. Ng is not a digraph, but pronounced as in English finger, .

Vowels are a ɛ e i ɔ o u. Doubled vowel letters appear to be sequences, not long vowels. Consonants are p t ch k, b d j g, m n ny, f s sh h, v z, l r y w.

There is no tone. Stress is on the second-last vowel. Exclamation marks come at the beginning of a clause, which ends in a comma or period as normal; question marks come at the end.

Grammar
The grammar is similar to Swahili, but in addition there is the 'vowel triangle', which is central to Afrihili inflection:

              a
            /   \
           u     e           ɛ
          /       \          
         ɔ __ o __ i

Many grammatical processes are accomplished by exchanging a vowel with its directional opposite on the triangle: a for o, u for i, e for ɔ, and vice versa. For example, a verb can be made into an adjective by changing its final vowel in this manner: from pinu 'to determine' comes the adjective pini 'determinate'. Ɛ does not participate in these swaps, but is used in other situations (below).

All nouns, and only nouns and adjectives modifying nouns, begin with a vowel. In the singular this will be different from the final vowel of the word; the plural is formed by making it the same as the final vowel. For example, omulenzi 'boy' becomes imulenzi 'boys'; similarly,  is 'language' and aluga 'languages'.

Nouns 
Nouns are derived from verbs or adjectives by prefixing the opposite of the final vowel, according to the triangle above. So, from pinu 'to determine' comes the noun  'determination'. If all the vowels in the verb or adjective are the same, as in mono 'to disgrace' and kana 'one', then the neutral vowel ɛ- is used: ɛmono 'a disgrace', ɛkana 'unity'.

Verbal nouns (gerunds) are formed from the infinitive in -de, and so always begin with ɔ- : soma 'reads', somade 'to read', ɔsomade yɛ papa 'reading is good'. (Compare ɔkaratide 'harvesting' and  'a harvest', from karati 'to harvest'.)

In the opposite direction, nouns drop their initial vowels to form verbs, and with the appropriate change in final vowel, adjectives. So, from etogo 'a house' comes togo (or togode) 'to house', and from umeme 'electricity' comes memɔ 'electric'.

Participles 
Participles are formed with mɛ-, further derived as nouns or adjectives (gerunds): mɛpini 'determinative', ɛmɛwako 'driver' (wako to drive).

Verb phrases are formed with tense prefixes, with the subject pronouns written together with the verb. (Subject pronouns are not used if there is a noun subject.) Objects, however, are written separately after the verb: From jira 'to wait for', mingijira lε 'I (mi-) would have waited for him (lɛ)'.

Nominative pronouns 
Pronouns include mi 'I', nɛ 'me and you', nɛu 'us and you', nu 'we' (not you), wu 'you (thou)' ku 'you (ye)', lɛ 'he', ta 'she', yo 'it', fu 'they'.

Possessive pronouns 
For possession, pronouns are prefixed on a noun, dropping their vowel: l'arafi 'his letter', w'agoji 'your money'.

Tense prefixes 
Tense prefixes include li- (past), ta- (future), lii- (habitual past), taa- (habitual future), yɛɛ- (habitual present), re- (present continuous -ing), ri- (past continuous -ing), ngi- (conditional, would), nge- (subjunctive, may), and a perfect in lo-. Simple present is not marked. U- forms relative clauses (who, which).

So, from du 'eat', lɛdu 'he eats', nɛtadu 'you & I will eat', fulidu 'they ate', miyɛɛdu ɛn zinga 'I eat in the morning (as a matter of habit)',  'I would eat / used to eat in the morning', miredu 'I am eating', nuridu 'we were eating (when)', kama kungiwa, kungidu 'if y'all would come, you'd eat', ni omuntu lodu 'the man has eaten'.

Demonstrative pronouns 
'This' and 'that' are ki and ka, which are pluralized with the suffix -nga, giving kinga 'these' and kanga 'those'. They may occur before a noun, or afterward by copying the final syllable: 
Ki omulenzi, omulenzi kinzi 'this boy'
Ka omukama, omukama kama 'that king'
Imukazi kangazi 'those girls'

Some suffixes are full syllables, as -wi inchoative (to get or become): sana 'drink', sanawi 'get drunk'; furaha 'happy', furahawi 'be happy'. However, most have an echo vowel, identical to the final vowel of the root, as in -bw- (passive): bona 'see',  'be seen'; or -t- '-able': bonata 'visible', dutu 'edible'.

'Of' (partitive?) is either a suffix -n or a particle pe, with opposite word order. Nun kisi or kisi pe nu 'some of us', imulenzin kisi or kisi pen imulenzi 'some of the boys' (the definite article ni is here reduced and suffixed to pe, giving pen).

When an adjective or numeral follows a noun, it takes the initial vowel of the noun as grammatical agreement, as well as the suffix -n:
 'a pleasant and good language'
 'one language'

Sample phrases

Zuri lu – Good day (alu 'a day')
Zuri zinga – Good morning
Zuri masa – Good afternoon
Zuri dani – Good evening
Zuri bali – Good night
Jo koni – Go at once
 – Cheers!
 – Find a good place to eat
Kama mingipewa l'arafi gaba milijo paasa, mingijira lε. – If I had received his letter before I went out, I would have waited for him.

Text
The following text, from a 1971 newsletter, was clipped on its left margin. Missing words are in brackets.

Notes

References
 K. A. Kumi Attobrah (1970, 1973) Ni Afrihili Oluga. The African Continental Language
 William S. Annis (2014) "Afrihili: An African Interlanguage", Fiat Lingua, April 2014

External links
An Afrihili newsletter (1971 version) on Roger Blench's website. (archived)
 A summary of additional details of the verbal and derivational system, Afrihili Notes. (archived)

Languages of Africa
Zonal constructed languages
Constructed languages introduced in the 1970s
1970 introductions
Languages of Ghana
Constructed languages